Ha Yu may refer to:

 Ha Yu (actor) (born 1946), actor from Hong Kong
 Ha Yu (director) (born 1963), or Yoo Ha, South Korean poet and film director

See also
 Hayu people
 Hayu language 
 Hayu (subscription service)
 Princess Hayu